City slicker or City Slickers may refer to:

City Slickers, a 1991 comedy movie
City Slickers II: The Legend of Curly's Gold, the 1994 sequel to City Slickers
The City Slicker, a 1918 film starring Harold Lloyd
Spike Jones & His City Slickers, an American popular music band in the 1940s and 1950s
Oklahoma City Slickers, two former association football (soccer) teams in Oklahoma City
"City Slickers", a financial column which appeared in the Daily Mirror during the 1990s